Natalie Alyn Lind (born 1999/2000) is an American actress.  She is known for her television series appearances, such as her recurring roles as Dana Caldwell in The Goldbergs and Silver St. Cloud in Gotham, and for her starring role as Lauren Strucker in Fox's The Gifted. Lind also starred as Danielle Sullivan in the first season of the ABC series Big Sky.

Early life
Lind is the oldest daughter of producer John Lind and actress Barbara Alyn Woods. She has two younger sisters, Emily and Alyvia, who are also actresses.

Career

Lind made her television debut on the series One Tree Hill. She appears in a recurring role as Dana Caldwell in the ABC series The Goldbergs and has had guest roles on such series as Criminal Minds, iCarly, Wizards of Waverly Place, and Flashpoint. She was cast as Silver St. Cloud in season two of Gotham, which debuted on September 21, 2015. In March 2017, Lind was cast in the role of Lauren Strucker, a mutant in the X-Men-derived Fox TV pilot The Gifted, which was picked up to series in May 2017. In June 2019, she was cast in a starring role of Ashley in the second season of the CBS All Access drama series, Tell Me a Story.

In March 2020, Lind was cast on ABC's Big Sky, playing the role of Danielle Sullivan, a kidnapping victim. In 2023, it was announced that she would be acting in the young adult romance Marked Men directed by Nick Cassavetes.

Filmography

References

External links

 
 

1999 births
21st-century American actresses
American child actresses
American film actresses
American television actresses
Living people
Place of birth missing (living people)